"Heat It Up" is the second single off Bubba Sparxxx's third full-length album The Charm (2006). It was produced by Mr Collipark. The song garnered a negative reception from critics. "Heat It Up" had less chart success than its predecessor "Ms. New Booty", peaking at numbers 24 and 57 on the Billboard Hot Rap Songs and Hot R&B/Hip-Hop Songs charts respectively.

Critical reception
"Heat It Up" received generally negative reviews from music critics. Steve 'Flash' Juon of RapReviews criticized the song for having production that's generic and simplistic sounding, and Bubba for delivering dull brag rap. Peter Relic of Rolling Stone found the song just as less effective than the other Collipark-produced song "Ms. New Booty", calling it "even more unimpressive than the first."

Live performance
Bubba performed "Heat It Up" with Mr. Collipark on Last Call with Carson Daly on August 3, 2006.

Charts

References

2005 songs
2006 singles
Bubba Sparxxx songs
Virgin Records singles
Songs written by Mr. Collipark